Alex Barron may refer to:

 Alex Barron (American football) (born 1982), American football player
 Alex Barron (juggler), British juggler
 Alex Barron (racing driver) (born 1970), American auto racing driver